For many years Wittingslow was Australia's (and one of the world's) largest traveling carnival operations, spanning more than 60 years in the outdoor entertainment industry.

Founder Thomas George Wittingslow made his start during the dark years of the Great Depression in the early 1930s. After a brief apprenticeship at a city fun parlour, Thomas went out on his own in 1932, working small shows and fairs in country Victoria. Returning to Melbourne for his first Royal Melbourne Show, Thomas began what was to become a lifelong association. His game of 'Guess Your Weight' involved the operator estimating, within four pounds, the exact weight of the customer.

After six years of war service, Thomas returned to the industry in 1946 and with son Des began working fairs in large provincial towns. They ventured into the first amusement rides at the Royal Melbourne Show, when merry-go-rounds or carousels were hugely popular after years of war-time austerity. The Melbourne Moomba Festival of 1948 saw Wittingslow present the first new generation "thrill" rides. Over the next 30 years, the Wittingslow family business grew steadily with three generations playing an active role. Bigger, more exciting rides and games from England, Europe and the United States delighted showground patrons.

In 1982 Tom Wittingslow formed a partnership with Terry Cartlidge and engineer and owner of CAMAC Ride manufacturing. This led to ventures into new ride designs and construction led to successful projects, such as the Sea World Corkscrew rollercoaster on Queensland's Gold Coast and many other successful thrill rides. Disagreements between the parties led to the dissolving of this partnership in 1986. CAMAC went onto building other notable rides such as the Lethal Weapon rollercoaster and other notable rides throughout SE Asia.

The Wittingslow Carnival operated at all major agricultural shows, including Melbourne, Sydney, Brisbane and Adelaide, and many street festivals in Melbourne. Since the 1950s, Wittingslow rides have also operated at the Rye and Rosebud Christmas Carnivals on the Mornington Peninsula.

After a series of unfortunate incidents, the Wittingslow operation went into receivership in 2001 ending an era for Australia's east coast agricultural shows. Since going into receivership, Wittingslow have returned, and are now trading as Amusements Australia.

Wittingslow Amusements is now run by grandson Michael, with his wife Manya, and son Morgan.

References
 'Show Business, Fun and Gambling' Tommy Wittingslow's Story
 The Age: 'Mouse crash sparks safety concerns' - 27 September 2003
 The Age: 'The seaside, sunblock and all the fun of the fair' -  3 January 2004
 David's Amusement Ride Extravaganza (features Wittingslow Amusements rides)
 The Age-Rye smiles say it all: a fair way to go became the family tradition

Carnivals in Australia
Entertainment companies of Australia
Entertainment companies established in 1932
Traveling carnivals
Australian companies established in 1932